Greg Halsey-Brandt is a Canadian politician, who served as a BC Liberal Member of the Legislative Assembly of British Columbia from 2001 to 2005, representing the riding of Richmond Centre. He served as Minister of State for Intergovernmental Relations from 2001 to 2004.

Prior to his election to the legislature, Halsey-Brandt was a planning consultant and municipal politician, who served as Mayor of Richmond from 1990 to 2001, and before that as a City Councillor from 1981 to 1990.

Halsey-Brandt returned to Richmond, British Columbia City Council when he was elected in the 2008 municipal elections. His wife Evelina, and ex-wife Sue were both also sitting Richmond city councillors.

References

External links
leg.bc.ca, Greg Halsey-Brandt

British Columbia Liberal Party MLAs
Year of birth missing (living people)
Richmond, British Columbia city councillors
Living people
Mayors of places in British Columbia
Members of the Executive Council of British Columbia
21st-century Canadian politicians